Lorenzo di Bonaventura (born January 13, 1957) is an American film producer and founder and owner of Di Bonaventura Pictures. He is best known for producing the G.I. Joe and Transformers film series. The films he produced have earned over $7 billion at the box office.

Life and career
Di Bonaventura spent the 1990s as an executive in the film industry eventually rising to president of worldwide production for Warner Bros. Pictures. His production company --  Di Bonaventura Pictures—is based at Paramount Pictures. His tenure at Warner Bros. included discovering and shepherding The Matrix into production, purchasing the rights to the Harry Potter books by J. K. Rowling.

In 2007 Di Bonaventura purchased the film rights to the six-part series of fantasy novels The Secrets of the Immortal Nicholas Flamel by Michael Scott. Di Bonaventura said that Scott's "fantastic series is a natural evolution from Harry Potter."

In the documentary Side by Side, Di Bonaventura criticized the ubiquitousness of inexpensive digital cameras that allow anyone to become a filmmaker, potentially saturating the media landscape with awful entertainment that the public wouldn't be able to distinguish from quality works. His argument stated that the new media landscape is flawed due to lack of a "tastemaker."

Personal life
Di Bonaventura graduated from Choate Rosemary Hall and Harvard University, where he played soccer. He later received an MBA from the Wharton School of the University of Pennsylvania. His father, Mario di Bonaventura, was a symphony conductor, and his uncle, Anthony di Bonaventura, was a concert pianist.

Di Bonaventura serves as chair of the Creative Council for Represent.Us, a nonpartisan anti-corruption organization.  He has served on the Claremont Graduate University Board of Trustees since 2015.

Filmography

Producer

Paramount Pictures

Sony Pictures Releasing

Summit Entertainment

Lionsgate Films

Warner Bros. Pictures

Others

Executive producer

Television
Zero Hour (2013)
The Real O'Neals (2016–2017)
Shooter (2016–2018)
Jupiter's Legacy (2021)
The New Look (Apple TV, in partnership with Todd A. Kessler)

See also
 Wilhelm Imkamp
 Yves Leterme 
 Yves Saint Laurent
 Martina Stella 
 Stanley Tucci 
 Caroline Vreeland

References

External links

1957 births
American film producers
Place of birth missing (living people)
Harvard University alumni
Living people
Skydance Media people
Writers from New York City
People from New York (state)
Wharton School of the University of Pennsylvania alumni
American people of Italian descent